Ditak is a village in the Artashat Municipality of the Ararat Province of Armenia.

References 

Report of the results of the 2001 Armenian Census

Populated places in Ararat Province